is a passenger railway station in the city of Tomioka, Gunma, Japan, operated by the private railway operator Jōshin Dentetsu.

Lines

Station layout
The station consists of a single side platform serving traffic in both directions.

Adjacent stations

History
It was renamed to its present name on 17 December 1921.

Surrounding area

See also
 List of railway stations in Japan

External links

 Jōshin Dentetsu 
  Burari-Gunma 

Railway stations in Gunma Prefecture
Railway stations in Japan opened in 1912
Tomioka, Gunma